Koby Altman (born September 16, 1982) is the President of Basketball Operations of the Cleveland Cavaliers of the National Basketball Association (NBA).

Early life
Altman was raised in Brooklyn, New York.  Altman received his bachelor's degree at Middlebury College as a Posse Foundation Scholar, where he was a three-year starter at point guard for the basketball team. After graduation, he went into real estate investment sales for three years. He then went to the University of Massachusetts Amherst (UMass), earning a master's degree in sports management. During that time, he was an assistant coach at nearby Amherst College. After his graduation from UMass, Altman continued in college coaching for several years, first as a graduate assistant at Southern Illinois in 2009–10 and then as a full-time assistant at Columbia. He is Jewish.

NBA executive
Altman joined the Cavaliers front office in 2012, would gradually rise through the ranks, was part of the 2016 NBA Championship team as director of pro personnel, and became assistant general manager for the 2016–17 season before being promoted to GM on July 24, 2017. When he was hired as the Cavaliers' GM in 2017, he was just one of four African American GMs in the league and one of the few NBA GMs who are Jewish.

Cleveland Cavaliers
In his first major move as general manager, he acquired an unprotected 2018 first-round draft pick (through the Brooklyn Nets), All-Star point guard Isaiah Thomas, rookie center Ante Žižić, small forward Jae Crowder, and a 2020 second-round pick (through the Miami Heat) from the Boston Celtics in exchange for disgruntled star point guard Kyrie Irving.  In September 2017, Altman's second major move came in the signing of three-time NBA Champion and multi-time All-Star guard Dwyane Wade. In February 2018, Altman made several trades during the trade deadline which all totaled saw Thomas, Channing Frye, Crowder, Derrick Rose, Iman Shumpert, Dwyane Wade, and their 2018 first-round pick traded away. In return, the Cavaliers received Rodney Hood, George Hill, Jordan Clarkson, and Larry Nance Jr. Notable draft picks for the Cavaliers under Altman include the 2018 8th pick, Collin Sexton, the 2019 5th pick, Darius Garland, the 2020 5th pick, Isaac Okoro, and the 2021 3rd pick, Evan Mobley.

Awards and honors
2016 NBA champion (as a member of the Cavaliers front office)

References

1982 births
Living people
African-American Jews
African-American sports executives and administrators
American men's basketball coaches
American men's basketball players
American sports executives and administrators
Amherst Mammoths men's basketball coaches
Basketball players from New York City
Basketball coaches from New York (state)
Cleveland Cavaliers executives
Columbia Lions men's basketball coaches
Jewish men's basketball players
Middlebury Panthers men's basketball players
New Utrecht High School alumni
Point guards
Southern Illinois Salukis men's basketball coaches
Sportspeople from Brooklyn
Isenberg School of Management alumni
21st-century African-American sportspeople
20th-century African-American people